The 2008 UK & Ireland Greyhound Racing Year was the 83rd year of greyhound racing in the United Kingdom and Ireland.

Summary
The premier competitions were won by Loyal Honcho (2008 English Greyhound Derby) and Shelbourne Aston (2008 Irish Greyhound Derby) respectively. However their achievements were overshadowed by the closure of the sports leading stadium Walthamstow.The shareholders sold up and the track closed in August despite assurances from the owners in December 2007 that no deal had been made to sell the track. The track had been opened in 1933 by William Chandler and was still owned by the Chandler family but the directors of Walthamstow Stadium Limited agreed to the sale of the Company’s freehold property to a development consortium led by Yoo Capital and K W Linfoot plc. Formal contracts were exchanged and the final race was held on Saturday 16 August. The closure left some of the best trainers in the country pondering their futures.

Racing Manager Chris Page joined Harlow Stadium along with five trainers, John Coleman, Mark Wallis Mick Puzey, Graham Sharp and Kelly Mullins but Puzey soon relinquishes his licence. John Sherry and Dick Hawkes retired, Paul Rich who had only just taken his father's (Peter Rich) licence in February left the sport while Seamus Cahill joined Hove and Paul Garland returned to Wimbledon. Stacey Baggs relinquished her licence to work for Ricky Holloway and her father Gary Baggs (a very successful trainer) passed away later that year in October.

Tracks
There was a major blow when Reading in Bennet Road closed after 33 years. The council did not renew the track's lease and the site would be redeveloped despite promises from the BS Group/Gaming International to build a new modern Reading stadium. Similar BS Group plans had failed to materialise at Bristol and Milton Keynes previously.

Portsmouth city council announced that the long-term lease was nearing its end and they were considering selling the Portsmouth Stadium site for redevelopment. Leaseholders GRA allowed the track to be taken under lease by a new company registered in March 2008, called PGS Ltd headed by Portsmouth general manager Eric Graham, who would pay £1,000 per year as a peppercorn rent.

Competitions
The IbetX Scottish Greyhound Derby started in horrendous weather and the track ran 170 slow, only three heats were completed before the meeting was abandoned. This meant that some greyhounds would have to run four times in nine days leading to withdrawals headed by Charlie Lister's team that included Clash Harmonica and Farloe Reason. Heat eight would result in a remarkable two dog heat. However the competition saw superb semi-finals with Paul Hennessy’s Tyrur Kieran breaking the track record when beating Loyal Honcho in 28.69. He went on to win a very strong final that included Derby finalist Loyal Honcho and Laurels champion Kylegrove Top.

News
Leading marathon runner Spiridon Louis retired in May after reaching the Dorando Marathon final. Sprinter Horseshoe Ping made the Scurry Gold Cup final again in addition to the Guys and Dolls final and won the National Sprint at Nottingham. Lenson Joker, a white and brindle dog picked up the Cesarewitch trophy before  winning the William Hill Grand Prix and Champion Stakes unbeaten. He would be voted Greyhound of the Year.

In December Irish Derby finalist Ballymac Ruso trained by Matt Dartnall recorded the fastest ever time for 480 metres (27.79 at Monmore) and Mark Wallis ended the year with the trainer's title, a remarkable achievement bearing in mind the upheaval caused when he lost his Walthamstow contract.

Former Wimbledon trainer Sydney 'Clare' Orton died on 11 May.

The Bord na gCon announced a 6% increase in prize money.

Roll of honour

Principal UK finals

	

+ Track record

Principal Irish finals

References 

Greyhound racing in the United Kingdom
Greyhound racing in the Republic of Ireland
2008 in British sport
2008 in Irish sport